Eyewitness accounts associated with the Joseph Smith Papyri have been analyzed extensively to understanding the content, purpose and meaning of the Book of Abraham, a canonized text of the Latter Day Saint movement.  In 1835, Joseph Smith, founder of the Latter Day Saint movement, came into possession of four mummies, two papyrus rolls, and various papyrus fragments, which Smith said contained the writings of the ancient biblical patriarchs Abraham and Joseph.

The papyrus and mummies were presumed burned in the Great Chicago Fire of 1871, but fragments of the papyri were rediscovered in 1967.  There are several dozen known eyewitness accounts from before the fire, which have become essential to understanding how much was lost, and which papyri the Book of Abraham came from.  The intent and meaning of each eyewitness have been highly scrutinized, and in some cases vigorously debated.

Eyewitness Accounts Prior to Joseph Smith's Possession

Eyewitness Accounts in the Kirtland Era 1835–1838

Eyewitness Accounts in the Missouri Era 1838–1839

Eyewitness Accounts in the Nauvoo Era 1839–1844

Eyewitness Accounts After the Death of Joseph Smith 1844–1871

Joseph Smith Journal Entries

References

Book of Abraham